"The Brick Moon" is a novella by American writer Edward Everett Hale, published serially in The Atlantic Monthly starting in 1869. It is a work of speculative fiction containing the first known depiction of the launch of an artificial satellite.

Synopsis 
"The Brick Moon" is presented as a journal. It describes the construction and launch into orbit of a sphere, 200 feet in diameter, built of bricks. The device is intended as a navigational aid, but is accidentally launched with people aboard. They survive, and so the story also provides the first known fictional description of a space station. The author even correctly surmised the idea of needing four satellites visible above the horizon for navigation, as in modern-day GPS.

Publication history
"The Brick Moon" was first released serially in three parts in The Atlantic Monthly in 1869. A fourth part, entitled "Life on the Brick Moon", was also published in The Atlantic Monthly in 1870. It was collected as the title work in Hale's anthology The Brick Moon and Other Stories in 1899.

Influence 

In 1877, Asaph Hall discovered the two moons of Mars. He wrote to Hale, comparing the smaller Martian moon, Deimos, to the Brick Moon.

In the Long Earth series by Terry Pratchett and Stephen Baxter a space station built in "The Gap" (where the Earth is missing) is named "the Brick Moon".  It appears in two of the novels: The Long War (2013) and The Long Mars (2014).

References

External links
 

1869 American novels
American speculative fiction novellas
Works originally published in The Atlantic (magazine)
Fictional space stations
1860s science fiction works